Yoshihiro Fujita may refer to:
 Yoshihiro Fujita (fighter) (born 1969), Japanese mixed martial artist
 Yoshihiro Fujita (wrestler) (born 1952), Japanese Greco-Roman wrestler